Agathocles is a Belgian political grindcore band. Founded in 1985, it is mainly known for producing a large quantity of split seven-inch EPs. They play a style of grindcore they have dubbed "mincecore". Their lyrical themes have focused on anti-fascism, animal liberation and anarchism. All of its members are vegetarians.

Their lineup has changed numerous times since they first started, the only consistent member being Jan Frederickx (also known as Jan AG).

Biography

1980s
Agathocles was formed in the Belgian city of Mol, aspiring to sound like bands such as Lärm and Hellhammer. Its original members, Jan and Erwin, were involved in the underground metal/punk scene since the start of the decade, releasing compilation tapes and zines. Only a few of their rehearsal tapes survive from 1984, their first year playing together, mainly as appearances on compilations.

Agathocles began playing concerts in 1985, although audiences were still small for the type of extreme music they produced. They had an on-air interview on the local radio station that year.

By 1987, the band's line-up had begun to settle, albeit temporarily, in the form of Jan, Ronny and Erwin. They also found a long-term rehearsal space—Jam, a youth club in Mol—where they would not receive complaints or be ejected, as had happened in previous rehearsal rooms. They recorded more compilation tracks, organised more small concerts, and played gigs with other bands who would become equally famous, such as Napalm Death and Pestilence (and later Extreme Noise Terror, as well as smaller bands such as Violent Mosquitos and Total Mosh Project).

The first Agathocles releases were issued in 1988, which saw the arrival of a split EP with Riek Boois, as well as their first solo outing, Cabbalic Gnosticism, both of which were originally on cassette. Other material was recorded at the same time, but not released until later.  By this time the band had four members, as Jakke had joined on guitar in December 1986, allowing Jan to concentrate on vocals.

Another guitarist, Guy, joined a year later, in 1989, and the split LP with the band Drudge was recorded and released on Deaf Records, as well as several other EPs. Towards the end of the year, the line-up changed yet again, with the bassist, Ronny, leaving the band and guitarist Jakke taking over from him.

1990s
A major line-up change occurred at the beginning of the decade, in May 1990, when Jan got rid of all the other members of the band and found two new members instead - Domingo on guitar and Burt on drums, with Jan now playing bass. Domingo and Burt were both from little-known Belgian grindcore band Necrosis, who recorded only one demo, in 1990. With the new line-up, the band ceased rehearsing in Mol, moving instead to the drummer's home town of Zichem. Several more EPs were released in the same year and, with the band growing in popularity, they played gigs in Denmark as well as Belgium and went on a mini tour with the Japanese grindcore band SxOxB.

More line-up changes occurred throughout the next few years. Ex-Agathocles drummer Erwin briefly returned in 1991, now playing bass guitar. After only a few months with this line-up, Domingo left the band, leaving the band as a three-piece group during the recording of their Agarchy EP in July. However, the band soon had four members again when Domingo was replaced by Chris. It was with this line-up that they recorded Theatric Symbolisation Of Life, but towards the end of the year, Erwin left the band again and Agathocles got a new bassist called Dirk.

In the summer of 1991, Agathocles also went on another tour, this time in East Germany, with vocalist Tuur from fellow Belgian mincecore band Reign Of Terror. Tuur did vocals for this tour because guitarist Chris was unable to tour with the band, so Jan had to take over his guitarist duties.

The band's line-up changed again in May 1992 when guitarist Chris and bassist Dirk left to form their own band. Agathocles found a new guitarist to take over from Chris - Steve (from Belgian grindcore band Intestinal Disease) - and Jan played bass guitar (as well as doing vocals). Two of the band's LPs (Cliché? and Use Your Anger) were recorded with this new line-up and they also played one gig in Italy for the first time in a small town named Macomer (Sardinia).

The band remained a 3-piece group throughout 1993, with the line-up staying consistent as Jan, Burt and Steve. It was with this line-up that Agathocles went on a major European tour, visiting Belgium, the Czech Republic, Slovakia, Germany and the Netherlands, as well as recording several more split EPs. In 1994, the band retained the same line-up, this time touring in Spain (in July of that year), where they recorded the Mince Mongers In Barna EP in the rehearsal room of Spanish mincecore band Violent Headache. The Black Clouds Determinate CD was also recorded in this year.

The line-up stayed the same during the first half of 1995, during which time Agathocles recorded their album Razor Sharp Daggers, as well as featuring on the compilation Metalopolis, which was released by the Belgian radio station Studio Brussel. In the summer, however, the line-up changed again, with Matty replacing Steve on guitar.

This line-up would stay constant through 1996 and for most of 1997, two years in which Agathocles did a lot more touring. This started at the beginning of 1996, when the band visited Turkey, playing alongside the band Radical Noise, and then they toured the Czech Republic with the mincecore band Malignant Tumour. During this tour, the band recorded a video as a benefit for a Czech animal rights group. As well as recording the album Thanks For Your Hostility and several more split EPs, Agathocles also recorded a studio session in 1996 on the radio station Studio Brussel. Another such session was done the year later, this time in the BBC studios in England, where they recorded a Peel Session, in the same way that many other famous grindcore bands have done. 1997 was also the year that the Humarrogance album was recorded (as well as even more split EPs) and the band also toured in Germany with Swedish band Driller Killer. In November, the line-up changed again, when the band returned to being a four-piece, with Vince joining as the bass guitarist.

With this new line-up, the band toured again in Germany with Driller Killer in 1998 before Matty and Vince left the band in June and Dirk rejoined as the guitarist, with Jan playing bass again. This new line-up, of Jan, Burt and Dirk recorded several more split EPs, and toured in the Czech Republic and Slovakia. They also played gigs with other bands in the underground scene such as Unholy Grave, My Minds Mine and Malignant Tumour. The band ended the decade with a line-up that would last for several years into the new millennium.

2000s 
In 2000, Agathocles released their sixth full-length, To Serve… to Protect, that was distributed through the Italian label Vacation House (later re-released with bonus tracks by the Brazilian labels No Fashion HC and Heavy Metal Rock).

Members
Jan Frederickx - guitar, vocals (1985-)
Nils Laureys - drums, vocals (2007-)
Koen - guitar (2012-)

Past members 
Erwin Vandenbergh - drums (1985-1990) bass (1991)
Ronny - bass (1987-1989)
Jakke - guitar (1987-1990)
Guy - guitar (1989-1990)
Domingo Smets - guitar (1990)
Burt Beyens - drums (1990-2002)
Chris - guitar (1991-1992)
Dirk - bass (1991-1992)
Steve Houtmeyers - guitar (1992-1995)
Matty Dupont - guitar (1995-1998)
Dirk Cuyx - guitar (1998-2007)
Roel Tulleneers - drums (2002-2007)
Tony Schepkens - bass (2007-2008)
Bram Criekemans - bass (2008-2012)

Discography

CDs
Keizershof disaster* 1986-2016 punk/straight edge/hardcore/crust
Theatric Symbolisation of Life'''  1992Use Your Anger  1992Black Clouds Determinate  1994Razor Sharp Daggers 1995The LPs: 1989-1991  1996Thanks For Your Hostility 1996Humarrogance 1997Split with Axed Up Conformist 1999 To Serve... to Protect... 2000Superiority Overdose 20014-Way Split with Abortion, Din-Addict and Malignant Tumour 2001Bomb Brussels (Live Album)  2001Alive & Mincing (Live Album) 2003Mincemania In Bulgaria  2004Mincer 2006Get Off your Ass/In Noise we Noise Split with Ruido Genital 2007Night Train To Terror split with Saul Turteltaub 2007Split with The Vanishing Act 2008Split with Armatura 2008Abstract split with Cü Sujo 2008Grind is Protest 2009Split with Crowd Control  2009"Imaginary Boundaries" 4-way split with Detrua Ideo/Violenta Dizimacao/Pissdeads  2009This is Not a Threat, It's a Promise 20104 way split with Kerenaneko, Prosuck and Rvota 2011Kanpai!! 2012Agathocles/Nauseate - Split CD 2014Commence to Mince 2016We Just Don't Fit 2018Baltimore Mince Massacre 2020

LPsSupposed It Was You (split with Drudge) 1989Split with Lunatic Invasion 1991Theatric Symbolisation Of Life 1992Agarchy / Use Your Anger   1997Split with Deadmocracy  1998Until It Bleeds (Best Of) 1997Live and Noisy (Live) 1997Mincecore (Compilation) 1998To Serve... To Protect 1999Live in Leipzig, Germany 1991 (Live) 1999Mincecore History 1985-1990 (Compilation) 2000Keep Mincing (Compilation) 2001Superiority Overdose 2001Mincecore History 1989-1993 (Best of) 2001Chop Off Their Trust (Split) 2002Live Aalst Belgium 1989 (Split) 2002Until It Bleeds Again (1994-1999) (Best of) 2002
Split With Sterbe Hilfe - Emoc T'now Modcnik Yht! (Split Album) 2003To Serve... To Protect / Leads To... (Best of) 2003

EPsIf This Is Gore, What's Meat Then (split with Riek Boois) 1988Split with Disgorge 1989Split with V.N.A. 1989Fascination of Mutilation 1989If This Is Cruel What's Vivisection Then? 1989Who Profits? Who Dies? (split with Morbid Organs Mutilation (M.O.M.)) 1989Split with Blood  1990Split with Smegma  1991Split with Putrid Offal  1991Split with Psycho  1991Agarchy   1991Cliché?   1992Split with Social Genocide 1993Blind World (split with Nasum) 1993Split with Starvation 1993War Scars (split with Kompost)  1993Distrust And Abuse  1993Split with Nyctophobic  1993Split with Bad Acid Trip  1993No Use ...For Hatred 1993Split with Patareni 1993Split with Smash The Brain 1993Split with Man Is The Bastard 1993Split with Plastic Grave 1994Split with Audiorrea 1994Split with Averno  1994Split with Punisher 1994Mince-Mongers in Barna  1994Split with Carcass Grinder 1994Split with Rot 1994Back To 1987 (Best Of Album)  1994Split with Notoken  1995Split with Voltifobia 1996Split with Vomit Fall  1996Split with Preparation H  1996Split with Autoritor  1996Split with Krush  1996Bomb Brussels   1996Minced Alive   1996Split with Black Army Jacket  1996Split with No Gain - Just Pain  1996Split with Respect 1997Split with Böses Blut 1997Split with PP7 Gaftzeb  1997Split with Looking For Answer  1997Split with Monolith (grindcore)  1997Split with Shikabane  1997Split with Malignant Tumour  1997Split with D.I.E.  1997Split with BWF   1997Split with Abstain  1997Split with Mitten Spider  1997Split with Comrades   1998Split with Spud  1998Split with Bloodsucker   1998Split with Depressor  1998Split with Hunt Hunters 1999Split with Glass Eyes 1999Split with Disreantiyouthhellchristbastardassmanx  1999Split with Grind Buto  1999Split with Piles Left to Rot 2000Split with Kontatto  2000Split with Din-Addict  2000Split with Brutal Headache 2000Kicked and Whipped/Keep On Selling Cocaine to Angels  2000Split with Disculpa  2000Split with Jan AG  2002Split with Front Beast  2003Split with Sodan Sankareita  2003Split EP with The Mad Thrashers  2004Split EP with Kadaverficker  2004Split with ... Our Last Beer(s)  2004Split with dios hastío  2005Split with Archagathus 2006Split with Seven Minutes of Nausea 2007Split with J. Briglia, L. Butler, D. Schoonmaker & J. Williams 2008Split with SMG 2008Split with Armatura 2008Split with Crowd Control 2008Split with I Hope You Suffer  2008Split with Repulsione 2008Split with Disleksick  2009Split with ShitFuckingShit and GAPSplit with Jandek (collaboration) Split with Sposa In Alto Mare (7 inches) 2011Split with Kurws (5 inches) 2013Split with Necrology 2015Split EP with G.I. Joke 2015Split with GodCum 2018
 Split with LtxDan 2017Split with Antikult 2019Split with Terminal Filth Wimpcore Killer (7 inch) 2021Stabilithocles (split with Стабильность) 2022

DTsCabbalic Gnosticism 1988Live In Gierle  1989

DVDsSuperiority Overdose'' 2002

References

External links 
 Agathocles Interview at Diabolical Conquest Webzine

Belgian grindcore musical groups
Musical groups established in 1985
Belgian musical trios
Geel
1985 establishments in Belgium